Benjamin Auffret (born 15 March 1995) is a French diver and European champion in diving from 10m platform.

He competed at the 2016 Summer Olympics in Rio de Janeiro, in the men's 10 metre platform.

He is the 2017 European champion in men's 10 metre platform.

He qualified to represent France at the 2020 Summer Olympics. However, he announced his retirement in April 2021 three month before the Summer Olympics in Tokyo.

References

External links
 
 
 
 

1995 births
Living people
People from Montereau-Fault-Yonne
French male divers
Olympic divers of France
Divers at the 2016 Summer Olympics
Sportspeople from Seine-et-Marne
21st-century French people